The men's tournament in the 2009 Rugby World Cup Sevens was held at The Sevens in Dubai alongside the inaugural women's tournament. The tournament was held from 5 March to 7 March, with Wales beating Argentina 19−12 at the final.

Teams

24 Teams took part in this tournament

Squads

Pool Stages

All times are local (UTC+4).

Pool A
{| class="wikitable" style="text-align: center;"
|-
!width="200"|Team
!width="40"|Pld
!width="40"|W
!width="40"|D
!width="40"|L
!width="40"|PF
!width="40"|PA
!width="40"|+/–
!width="40"|P
|-bgcolor=ccffcc
|align=left|
|3||3||0||0||107||12||+95||9
|-bgcolor=ffe6bd
|align=left|
|3||2||0||1||57||34||+23||7
|-bgcolor=ffcccc
|align=left|
|3||1||0||2||29||90||–61||5
|-bgcolor=ffcccc
|align=left| Arabian Gulf
|3||0||0||3||22||79||–57||3
|}

Pool B
{| class="wikitable" style="text-align: center;"
|-
!width="200"|Team
!width="40"|Pld
!width="40"|W
!width="40"|D
!width="40"|L
!width="40"|PF
!width="40"|PA
!width="40"|+/–
!width="40"|Pts
|-bgcolor=ccffcc
|align=left|
|3||3||0||0||90||27||+63||9
|-bgcolor=ffe6bd
|align=left|
|3||2||0||1||64||55||+9||7
|-bgcolor=ffe6bd
|align=left|
|3||1||0||2||62||57||+5||5
|-bgcolor=ffcccc
|align=left|
|3||0||0||3||15||92||–77||3
|}

Pool C
{| class="wikitable" style="text-align: center;"
|-
!width="200"|Team
!width="40"|Pld
!width="40"|W
!width="40"|D
!width="40"|L
!width="40"|PF
!width="40"|PA
!width="40"|+/–
!width="40"|Pts
|-bgcolor=ccffcc
|align=left|
|3||3||0||0||60||26||+34||9
|-bgcolor=ffe6bd
|align=left|
|3||2||0||1||62||41||+21||7
|-bgcolor=ffe6bd
|align=left|
|3||1||0||2||59||62||–3||5
|-bgcolor=ffcccc
|align=left|
|3||0||0||3||27||79||–52||3
|}

Pool D
{| class="wikitable" style="text-align: center;"
|-
!width="200"|Team
!width="40"|Pld
!width="40"|W
!width="40"|D
!width="40"|L
!width="40"|PF
!width="40"|PA
!width="40"|+/–
!width="40"|Pts
|-bgcolor=ccffcc
|align=left|
|3||3||0||0||74||12||+62||9
|-bgcolor=ffe6bd
|align=left|
|3||1||0||2||45||55||–10||5
|-bgcolor=ffe6bd
|align=left|
|3||1||0||2||36||49||–13||5
|-bgcolor=ffcccc
|align=left|
|3||1||0||2||34||73||–39||5
|}

Pool E
{| class="wikitable" style="text-align: center;"
|-
!width="200"|Team
!width="40"|Pld
!width="40"|W
!width="40"|D
!width="40"|L
!width="40"|PF
!width="40"|PA
!width="40"|+/–
!width="40"|Pts
|-bgcolor=ccffcc
|align=left|
|3||3||0||0||94||36||+58||9
|-bgcolor=ccffcc
|align=left|
|3||2||0||1||79||40||+39||7
|-bgcolor=ffe6bd
|align=left|
|3||1||0||2||48||69||–21||5
|-bgcolor=ffcccc
|align=left|
|3||0||0||3||26||102||–76||3
|}

Pool F
{| class="wikitable" style="text-align: center;"
|-
!width="200"|Team
!width="40"|Pld
!width="40"|W
!width="40"|D
!width="40"|L
!width="40"|PF
!width="40"|PA
!width="40"|+/–
!width="40"|Pts
|-bgcolor=ccffcc
|align=left|
|3||3||0||0||73||12||+61||9
|-bgcolor=ccffcc
|align=left|
|3||2||0||1||58||19||+39||7
|-bgcolor=ffcccc
|align=left|
|3||1||0||2||38||95||–57||5
|-bgcolor=ffcccc
|align=left|
|3||0||0||3||31||74||–43||3
|}

Knockout

Bowl

Plate

Cup

References

Men